Metro is a free daily newspaper in Philadelphia which began publishing on January 24, 2000. Its main competition is the Philadelphia Daily News. In 2004, Metro surpassed The Daily News in circulation, 143,798 to 141,868, to move into second behind 372,297 for The Philadelphia Inquirer. It was the first Metro edition published in North America and the ninth edition since the first in Stockholm in 1995.

Overview
Lawyers representing the publishers of The Philadelphia Inquirer, Philadelphia Daily News, USA Today and The New York Times filed an action in Federal Court three days before Metro'''s first publication to block local transit authority SEPTA from giving what they considered to be a competitive advantage to Metro.

SEPTA signed a five-year contract with TPI Metro. Part of the contract allows SEPTA to produce one page in each edition; however, aside from that page SEPTA has no control over any other aspect of the paper. The contract calls for Metro to pay $45,000 a month to SEPTA, which they stopped paying in March 2003, claiming SEPTA failed to live up to the terms of the contract. Despite lawsuits and counter-suits, in 2004 TPI Metro PA and SEPTA signed a three-year contract which increased payments to $65,000 a month.

The daily is primarily distributed by old-time newspaper hawkers paid to station themselves in areas with high pedestrian traffic, who offer the free paper to anyone who passes by. In addition, Metro'' can be found in distinctive green boxes on corners and in train and subway stations, echoing the colorful green and orange template used in all editions.

In 2009, Metro International sold its US papers to a former executive.

In March 2019, the paper eliminated three of its four general news staffers. The paper was bought by Schneps Media from former owner Metro US in December 2019. The paper will continue to publish under its current name, but the entire staff had been laid off during the sale.

See also
Bruce Walsh

References

Newspapers published in Philadelphia
Daily newspapers published in Pennsylvania
2000 establishments in Pennsylvania
Free daily newspapers